Podiceps is a genus of birds in the grebe family. The genus name comes from Latin podicis, "rear-end"  and ped, "foot", and is a reference to the placement of a grebe's legs towards the rear of its body.

It has representatives breeding in Europe, Asia, North, and South America. Most northern hemisphere species migrate in winter to the coast or warmer climates.

They breed in vegetated areas of freshwater lakes, nesting on the water's edge, since their legs are set too far back for easy walking. Usually two eggs are laid, and the striped young may be carried on the adult's back.

All the genus are excellent swimmers and divers, and pursue their fish prey underwater.

Adults have striking breeding plumage, with no difference between the sexes. In winter, the plumage is subdued whites and greys.

Systematics
The genus Podiceps was erected by the English naturalist John Latham in 1787. The type species was subsequently designated as the great crested grebe (Podiceps cristatus). The genus name combines variants on the Latin podex, roughly meaning "rear-end", and pes, meaning "foot".

The black-necked, Colombian, silvery, and Junin grebes are very closely related and were formerly sometimes separated as the genus Dyas. The great grebe has also sometimes been separated as the sole member of the genus Podicephorus.

The genus contains nine species:

One of the very oldest fossil grebes known to date actually belongs to this genus. Regarding grebes, the fossil record leaves much to be desired, being quite complete for the last 5 million years before present but very incomplete before the Pliocene.

Fossil species of Podiceps are:
 †Podiceps arndti Chandler, 1990 (Piacenzian stage of North America)
 †Podiceps csarnotanus Kessler, 2009 (Piacenzian stage of Europe)
 †Podiceps discors Murray, 1967 (Piacenzian stage of North America)
 †Podiceps dixi Brodkorp, 1963 (Chibanian to the Tarantian stages of Florida, United States)
 †Podiceps howardae Storer, 2001 (Zanclean age of North Carolina, United States)
 †Podiceps miocenicus Kessler, 1984 (Tortonian age of Moldova)
 †Podiceps oligoceanus (Shufeldt, 1915) (Aquitanian age of North America)
 †Podiceps parvus (Shufeldt, 1913) (Gelasian to the Calabrian stages of North America)
 †Podiceps pisanus (Shufeldt, 1913)  (Piacenzian stage of Italy)
 †Podiceps solidus Kuročkin, 1985 (Zanclean age of Western Mongolia)
 †Podiceps subparvus (Miller & Bowman, 1958) 
Podiceps? sp. (Late Pliocene of WC USA) 
Podiceps sp. (Early Pleistocene of Dursunlu, Turkey)

Among the material assigned to P. parvus were bones of another species, which may or may not belong in this genus.

References 

 
Bird genera
Podicipedidae